A simile is a figure of speech that directly compares two things. Similes differ from metaphors by highlighting the similarities between two things using comparison words such as "like", "as", "so", or "than", while metaphors create an implicit comparison (i.e. saying something "is" something else). This distinction is evident in the etymology of the words: simile derives from the Latin word similis ("similar, like"), while metaphor derives from the Greek word metapherein ("to transfer"). As in the case of metaphors, the thing that is being compared is called the tenor, and the thing it is being compared to is called the vehicle.
Author and lexicographer Frank J. Wilstach compiled a dictionary of similes in 1916, with a second edition in 1924.

Uses

In literature 
 "O My  like a red, red rose." "A Red, Red Rose," by Robert Burns.
 John Milton, Paradise Lost, a Homeric simile:::As when a prowling Wolf,
Whom hunger drives to seek new haunt for prey,
Watching where Shepherds pen their Flocks at eve
In hurdl'd Cotes amid the field secure,
Leaps o'er the fence with ease into the Fold:
. . . . . . .
So clomb this first grand Thief into God's Fold
 William Shakespeare, The Merchant of Venice:

How far that little candle throws his beams!
So shines a good deed in a naughty world.

In comedy 
Similes are used extensively in British comedy, notably in the slapstick era of the 1960s and 1970s. In comedy, the simile is often used in negative style: "he was as daft as a brush." They are also used in comedic context where a sensitive subject is broached, and the comedian will test the audience with response to subtle implicit simile before going deeper. The sitcom Blackadder featured the use of extended similes, normally said by the title character. For example:
Baldrick: I have a plan, sir.
Blackadder: Really, Baldrick? A cunning and subtle one?
Baldrick: Yes, sir.
Blackadder: As cunning as a fox who's just been appointed Professor of Cunning at Oxford University?

In business 
Business opportunities are like buses, there's always another one coming.
 Richard Branson

In languages other than English 

Given that similes emphasize affinities between different objects, they occur in many cultures and languages.

Arabic 
Sayf al-Din al-Amidi discussed Arabic similes in 1805: "On Substantiation Through Transitive Relations".

Vietnamese 

Thuy Nga Nguyen and Ghil'ad Zuckermann (2012) classify Vietnamese similes into two types: Meaning Similes and Rhyming Similes.

The following is an example:

Whereas the above Vietnamese example is of a rhyming simile, the English simile "(as) poor as a church mouse" is only a semantic simile.

Telugu
In telugu, simile is known as upamaalankaaramu (ఉపమాలంకారము). Based on the components of the sentence in which the comparison is made, they are classified into complete (పూర్ణోపమాలంకారము- puurnopamaalankaaramu) and incomplete (లుప్తోపమాలంకారము- lupthopamaalankaaramu) similes.
The classic example of a complete simile is:
ఆమె ముఖము చంద్రబింబము వలెనున్నది (Her face looks like a moon).

See also 

 Alliteration
 Analogy
 Description
 Figure of speech
 Homeric simile
 Hyperbole
 Hypocatastasis
 Like (as a preposition used in comparisons)
 Metaphor
 Metonymy
 Personification
 Phono-semantic matching
 Tautology (language)
 Simile aria

References

External Links 

 Examples of Simile in Literature

Rhetorical techniques
Figures of speech
Narrative techniques
Descriptive technique
Comparisons